The Bayonne School District is a comprehensive public school district serving students from pre-kindergarten through twelfth grade from Bayonne in Hudson County, New Jersey, United States.

As of the 2020–21 school year, the district, comprised of 13 schools, had an enrollment of 10,059 students and 763.0 classroom teachers (on an FTE basis), for a student–teacher ratio of 13.2:1.

The district is classified by the New Jersey Department of Education as being in District Factor Group "CD", the sixth-highest of eight groupings. District Factor Groups organize districts statewide to allow comparison by common socioeconomic characteristics of the local districts. From lowest socioeconomic status to highest, the categories are A, B, CD, DE, FG, GH, I and J.

After the state rejected a budget plan that would have cut 85 positions and raised taxes by almost 4%, the board of education voted in April 2017 to cut a total of 300 positions, including 260 non-tenured teachers, to achieve $6 million in savings from the earlier proposed $133 million budget.

Awards and recognition 
During the 2008-09 school year, Public School #14 Gifted & Talented was recognized with the National Blue Ribbon School Award of Excellence by the United States Department of Education, the highest award an American school can receive. In 2009-2010, Washington Community School was awarded the Blue Ribbon Award.

For the 2004–05 school year, Mary J. Donohoe No. 4 School was named a "Star School" by the New Jersey Department of Education, the highest honor that a New Jersey school can achieve. It is the fourth school in Bayonne to receive this honor. The other three are Bayonne High School in 1995-96, Midtown Community School in 1996-97 and P.S. #14 in the 1998-99 school year.

During the 2008–09 school year, Washington Community School was awarded the ASCA Honor Council Excellence Award, which is given to school's Student Councils who have met the requirements and completed projects in the areas of in leadership, citizenship, and community service.

Schools
Schools in the district (with 2020–21 enrollment data from the National Center for Education Statistics) are:
Elementary schools
John M. Bailey School No. 12 (656 students; in grades PreK-8)
Albert McCormick, Jr., Principal
Mary J. Donohoe No. 4 (459; PreK-8)
Philip J. Baccarella, Principal
Henry E. Harris No. 1 (637; PreK-8)
Maria Kazmir, Principal
Lincoln Community School No. 5 (433; PreK-8)
Keith Makowski, Principal
Horace Mann No. 6 (641; PreK-8)
Dr. Catherine Quinn, Principal
Nicholas Oresko School No. 14 (444; PreK-8) an advanced school for gifted and talented students in academics, the arts, and physical education
Charles Costello, Principal
Dr. Walter F. Robinson No. 3 (772; PreK-8). The facility was originally opened in 1910 as Bayonne High School, and was changed to an elementary school in the late 1930s when the present high school facility was completed. In 1977, it was renamed after a prominent history teacher who became school principal and Assistant Superintendent of Schools and authored a history of the city of Bayonne.
Dr. Karen J. Fiermonte, Principal
William Shemin Midtown Community School No. 8 (1,230; PreK-8). In November 2019, the school was renamed to honor World War I Medal of Honor hero, and Bayonne resident, William Shemin.
Dr. Wachera Ragland-Brown, Principal
Phillip G. Vroom No. 2 (485; PreK-8)
Stacey Janeczko, Principal
George Washington Community School No. 9 (677; PreK-8)
George Becker, Principal
Woodrow Wilson School No. 10 (747; PreK-8)
Maureen Hurley-Brown, Principal
High school
Bayonne High School (1,290; 9-12)
Richard Baccarella, Principal
Bayonne Alternative High School (141; 9-12)

Dress code
The Bayonne Board of Education has implemented a dress code that took effect in the 2006-2007 school year for students in Pre-K through 8th grade. The plan was intended to "increase student identification with their schools and the district, Eliminate many of the distractions associated  with differences in social or economic status, Allow the children, their teachers and the Board of Education to concentrate on shared pursuit of educational excellence and Instill a sense of belonging and school pride". A heated battle was fought between enraged parents and grandparents and the Board, with parents and grandparents upset at the manner in which the policy was imposed, the cost of the uniforms, the loss of freedom of expression to students in choosing the clothing they wear and issues regarding the manner in which the contract was awarded.

Administration
Core members of the district's administration are:
John J. Niesz, Superintendent
Daniel Castles, Business Administrator
Gary Maita, Board Secretary

Board of education
The district's board of education is comprised of nine members who set policy and oversee the fiscal and educational operation of the district through its administration. As a Type II school district, the board's trustees are elected directly by voters to serve three-year terms of office on a staggered basis, with three seats up for election each year held (since 2015) as part of the November general election. The board appoints a superintendent to oversee the district's day-to-day operations and a business administrator to supervise the business functions of the district.

In a November 2015 referendum, voters approved by a 3-1 margin a change from a Type I (appointed) to Type II (elected) school board.

References

External links
Bayonne School District

School Data for the Bayonne School District, National Center for Education Statistics

Bayonne, New Jersey
New Jersey District Factor Group CD
School districts in Hudson County, New Jersey
District boards of education in the United States